If Everyone Was Listening is a studio album released by English singer Michael Ball. It was released on 17 November 2014 in the United Kingdom by Union Square Music. The album peaked at number 21 on the UK Albums Chart.

Background
Talking about the album, Michael Ball said, "People will assume what a record is going to be like and they are loath to even give it a listen. I sometimes feel I want to release an album without people knowing it is me."

Critical reception
Writing for the Daily Express, Clive Davis wrote the album proved "there is more to Ball than those anthems from Les Misérables. Reflecting his passion for Americana and the neglected corners of the singer-songwriter repertoire, the record might just be the best thing the singer has ever recorded."

Singles
"What We Ain't Got" was released as the lead single from the album on 17 November 2014.

Track listing
All songs produced by Nick Patrick and Michael Ball.

Charts

Release history

References

2014 albums
Michael Ball albums